Carabdytes plantaris is a naturally uncommon species of diving beetle in the family Dytiscidae. It is endemic to New Zealand. For over a century, it was known from just a single specimen collected in 1880 "near Dunedin", and doubts were cast on whether it was actually a New Zealand species at all. In 1986, it was rediscovered when several were collected from a roadside pond near Lake Ellesmere. Carabdytes plantaris is now classed as "naturally uncommon" by the Department of Conservation.

This species was formerly a member of the genus Rhantus.

References

Beetles of New Zealand
Beetles described in 1882